RAF Brawdy is a former Royal Air Force satellite station located  east of St Davids, Pembrokeshire and  south west of Fishguard, Pembrokeshire, Wales. It was operational between 1944 and 1992 being used by both the Royal Air Force and the Royal Navy before the site was turned over to the British Army and renamed Cawdor Barracks.

History
The Pembrokeshire base was officially opened on 2 February 1944 as a satellite station for the nearby RAF St Davids with No. 517 Squadron RAF moving in a day before with the Handley Page Halifax Mk V before changing to the Mk III in March 1945. The squadron moved to RAF Chivenor on 30 November 1945. The next squadron to move in was 521 Squadron from December 1944 until May 1945 as a detachment operating the Boeing Fortress II (B-17F). Between 2 February 1944 and 27 April 1946 595 Squadron aircraft may have been based here with a variety of aircraft as a detachment.

Fleet Air Arm use

On 1 January 1946, the station was handed over to the Fleet Air Arm of the Royal Navy and became Royal Naval Air Station (RNAS) Brawdy or HMS Goldcrest II. It was initially used as a Relief Landing Ground for RNAS Dale. After the closure of Dale, it was commissioned as HMS Goldcrest on 4 September 1952 and in March 1953 the first Hawker Sea Hawk entered service with 806 Naval Air Squadron at RNAS Brawdy. From 1963 till 1971, Fairey Gannets and Hawker Hunters were based at Brawdy in 849 NAS and 738/759 respectively. The Gannets were primarily used in Airborne Early Warning (AEW) and the Hunters for advanced flying training including low-level Navigation, ground attack and air-to-air weapons training. The Royal Navy left in 1971 and the base was allocated to the Department of the Environment.

The following squadrons were stationed here at various points during this period:

 727 Naval Air Squadron
 736 Naval Air Squadron
 738 Naval Air Squadron
 751 Naval Air Squadron
 759 Naval Air Squadron
 767 Naval Air Squadron
 773 Naval Air Squadron
 784 Naval Air Squadron
 800 Naval Air Squadron
 801 Naval Air Squadron
 802 Naval Air Squadron
 804 Naval Air Squadron
 807 Naval Air Squadron
 811 Naval Air Squadron
 813 Naval Air Squadron
 824 Naval Air Squadron
 831 Naval Air Squadron
 891 Naval Air Squadron
 892 Naval Air Squadron
 893 Naval Air Squadron
 895 Naval Air Squadron
 897 Naval Air Squadron
 898 Naval Air Squadron
 1831 Naval Air Squadron

Back to Royal Air Force control
In February 1974 the Royal Air Force returned with D Flight of 22 Squadron taking up residence with their Westland Whirlwind HAR.10 search and rescue helicopters. In September of the same year No. 229 Operational Conversion Unit RAF (later the Tactical Weapons Unit) joined D Flight having been forced to relocate after the closure of RAF Chivenor.

The station was home to Hawker Hunter aircraft of the TWU, and the gate guardian at the base was initially a Supermarine Spitfire, this was replaced in the early 80s by Hawker Hunter FGA.9 (XE624). This airframe was subsequently sold to Steve Petch, a private collector.

Between 1 September 1976 and July 1978 a detachment of 202 Squadron flying Westland Whirlwind HAR.10s used the airfield. By the late 1970s it operated BAe Hawk T.1A (234 and 79 Squadron).

Closure of RAF station
As part of the rationalisation of advanced and tactical weapons training, flying ceased at Brawdy on 31 August 1992. A small number of RAF personnel remained including No. 202 Squadron and their Westland Sea Kings, which eventually left in July 1994.

Naval Facility Brawdy

In 1974 Naval Facility Brawdy was established adjacent to Royal Air Force Station Brawdy as the terminus of new Sound Surveillance System (SOSUS) arrays covering the eastern Atlantic. After commissioning on 5 April 1974 NAVFAC Brawdy became the first "super NAVFAC" with some four hundred U.S. and United Kingdom military and civilian personnel assigned. In 1985 a new type of fixed surveillance system, the Fixed Distributed System (FDS), test array was terminated at the facility. The facility was decommissioned 1 October 1995 after its arrays had been "remoted" and its equipment moved to the Joint Maritime Facility, St Mawgan, Cornwall.

Cawdor Barracks
Brawdy was transferred to the British Army in 1995 and became Cawdor Barracks, the army's main electronic warfare base. The name originated from the local Earls of Cawdor (who owned the Stackpole Estate).

References

Citations

Bibliography

External links
 Airliners.net Photo Gallery of Aircraft at RAF Brawdy
 Air Britain Photo Gallery of Aircraft at RAF Brawdy
 Ivor "Taff" Davies Photo Gallery of Aircraft at RAF Brawdy
 Jet Photos.net Photo Gallery of Aircraft at RAF Brawdy
 XE624.org - Home of the ex-RAF Brawdy Gate Guard Hunter FGA.9
 United States Navy - NAVFAC Brawdy
 1986 Phantom Aircrash Raf Brawdy
 RAF Brawdy, Wales 1985 ~ 1987 Air Shows

Brawdy